The persecution of the Feyli Kurds was a systematic persecution of Feylis by Saddam Hussein between 1970 and 2003. The persecution campaigns led to the expulsion, flight and effective exile of the Feyli Kurds from their ancestral lands in Iraq. The persecution began when a large number of Feyli Kurds were exposed to a big campaign by the regime that began by the dissolved RCCR issuance for 666 decision, which deprived Feyli Kurds of Iraqi nationality and considered them as Iranians. The systematic executions started in Baghdad and Khanaqin in 1979 and later spread to other Iraqi and Kurdish areas. 

An estimated 300,000–500,000 Feyli Kurds had been deported to Iran as a result of the persecution campaigns and at least 15,000 Feyli Kurds have disappeared. Their remains have not been found. 

In 2011, the Iraqi Parliament voted to recognize the 1980 massacre of Feyli Kurds under the regime of Saddam Hussein as genocide.

Forced deportations
In 1969, the Iraqi government launched a campaign of forced deportation and exile targeting the Feyli Kurds. In 1970, more than 70,000 Feylis were deported to Iran and their citizenship was revoked. Prominent and high-level Feyli Kurdish merchants and academics in Baghdad were specifically targeted. Numerous disappearances and executions were reported by activists between 1970 and 1973. 

On 7 May 1980, Saddam Hussein signed decree number 666 which legalized and ordered the confiscation, forced deportation, exile and detention of Feyli Kurds. Saddam justified the decree by accusing Feyli Kurds of having "foreign origin" and "disloyalty to the people and father land and to the political and social principles of the Revolution". In the same year, the mass deportation of Feyli Kurds began in Baghdad and more than 300,000 Feyli Kurds were deported to Iran, many having had their property and official papers confiscated. The deportees were not allowed to take with them anything apart from the clothes they were wearing when they were picked up from their homes, schools, government offices, workplaces, shops and military units. Male adults were randomly detained and sent to the various Iraqi prisons. It is estimated that around 25,000 Feyli Kurds died due to captivity and torture.

Aftermath
In 2003, the UNCHR estimated that 65% of 20,000 refugees in Iran are Feyli Kurds who were forcefully deported during the genocide. Most refugees who returned to Iraqi had difficulties to apply for the citizenship. 

In 2006, the spokesman of Kurdistan Alliance, Muayad al-Tayeb, called on Iraqi and Kurdish parliaments to support Feyli refugees, stating that "Feyli Kurds have been subjected to persecution for three reasons, first because they are Kurds, second they are from the Shiite sect and third because they are patriotic people and joined the Kurdish and Iraqi national movement."

In 2010, the Iraqi Ministry of Displacement and Migration reported that since 2003 about 100,000 Feylis have had their citizenship reinstated. Although according to recent statistics from the Iraqi Minister of Immigration, between April 2003 and April 2013, only 16,580 Feyli Kurds had their nationality reinstated, out of an estimated population of at least 150,000 Feyli Kurds denaturalized during the Ba’ath era who applied to get their Iraqi citizenship back.

See also
 Anfal genocide
 Halabja chemical attack

References

Massacres of Kurds
Persecution of Kurds in Iraq
Saddam Hussein